Daniel Dye Johnson was an officer in the Union Army during the American Civil War. He later became a (Democratic) Senator and Senate President of the West Virginia Senate from Tyler County and served from 1872 to 1877 and from 1879 to 1881. He died in 1893.

References

West Virginia state senators
Presidents of the West Virginia State Senate
1836 births
1893 deaths
19th-century American politicians